St Giles' Hospital was a hospital located in Camberwell, London.

History
The hospital had its origins in the Camberwell Workhouse Infirmary which was completed in 1875. A large circular tower was added in 1890 and further ward blocks were completed in 1903. It became the Camberwell Parish Infirmary in 1913 and St Giles' Hospital in 1930. It was hit by a V-1 flying bomb during the Second World War. It joined the National Health Service in 1948 and closed in 1983. The circular tower, which is a grade II listed building, has since been converted for residential use.

References

External links

Camberwell Infirmary Extension - 1890 article on the newly completed circular ward, in The Building news and engineering journal v.58 :1(1890) p.305

Defunct hospitals in London
Hospital buildings completed in 1890
Hospitals established in 1875
Hospitals disestablished in 1983